Churchill—Keewatinook Aski (formerly Churchill) is a federal electoral district in Manitoba, Canada, that has been represented in the House of Commons of Canada since 1935. It covers the northern four-fifths of Manitoba, a vast wilderness area dotted with small municipalities and First Nations reserves. It was named after the town of Churchill, Manitoba, which resides on Churchill River. It is the fifth-largest riding in all of Canada.

The riding has the highest percentage of First Nations people (61.1%) in Canada, as well as the highest percentage of Cree speakers - both those whose mother tongue (21.6%) is Cree and those that use it as a home language (16.6%).

History

The riding was created in 1933 when Nelson riding was abolished. The entire area of Nelson was transferred into the new riding of Churchill.

This riding gained territory from Selkirk—Interlake and was renamed "Churchill—Keewatinook Aski" during the 2012 electoral redistribution. "Keewatinook Aski" (ᑮᐍᑎᓄᕽ ᐊᐢᑭᐩ kîwêtinohk askiy) means Northern region in Cree language.

Members of Parliament

This riding has elected the following Members of Parliament:

Current Member of Parliament
Its Member of Parliament (MP) is Niki Ashton. She is a member of the New Democratic Party.

Election results

Churchill—Keewatinook Aski, 2015–present

Churchill, 1935–2015

See also
 List of Canadian federal electoral districts
 Past Canadian electoral districts

References

 
 Expenditures - 2008
Expenditures - 2004
Expenditures - 2000
Expenditures - 1997

Notes

Manitoba federal electoral districts
Churchill, Manitoba
Flin Flon
The Pas
Thompson, Manitoba